Mohammad Mamun Miah (born 11 September 1987) is a Bangladeshi professional footballer who plays as a defender for Bangladesh Premier League club Abahani Limited Dhaka. He plays on a centre back position.

2018 Federation Cup final incident
On 23 November 2018, Abahani Limited Dhaka took on Bashundhara Kings in the 2018 Federation Cup, and 94 minutes into the game a fight broke out as, Kings defender Sushanto Tripura punched Abahni striker Nabib Newaj Jibon, leading to teammate Mamun Mia retaliating, by running from his own penalty area and landing a flying "Kung Fu" styled kick on Sushanto. The Bangladesh Football Federation, suspended Shushanto for six games and fined him Tk 100,000, while Mamun was fined a total of Tk 50,000 and had received a one match ban. The incident received mass media attention over the next few weeks.

2021, saw Shushanto, Zibon and Mamun become teammates at Dhaka Abahani, and later all three of them stated in an interview that they have made amends.

References

Living people
1987 births
Bangladeshi footballers
Bangladesh international footballers
Footballers at the 2010 Asian Games
Footballers from Dhaka
People from Sylhet Division
Abahani Limited (Dhaka) players
Mohammedan SC (Dhaka) players
Rahmatganj MFS players
Association football defenders
Asian Games competitors for Bangladesh